LaBreeska Hemphill (February 4, 1940 - December 9, 2015) was an American Southern gospel performer. She was a member of The Happy Goodman Family and The Hemphills. With her husband and children, she won eight GMA Dove Awards and three BMI Awards, and she was inducted into the Dollywood Gospel Hall of Fame and the Delta Music Museum Hall of Fame.

Early life
Hemphill was born in 1940 in Flat Creek, Alabama. Her father was Walter Erskine Rogers and her mother, Gussie Mae Goodman.

Career
Hemphill start performing Southern gospel music with her parents as part of The Happy Goodman Family in childhood. They performed at the Ryman Auditorium in Nashville, Tennessee in 1949.

Hemphill and her husband began performing Southern gospel together at the Living Way Apostolic Church in West Monroe, Louisiana. They later pastored a Pentecostal church in Bastrop, Louisiana. They released their first record as The Hemphills through Canaan Records in 1966. They were active from the 1970s to the 1990s. Over the course of their career, they released over 20 records. Hemphill sang hit songs like He's Still Working On Me, I Claim the Blood, Grandma's Rocking Chair, and Unfinished Task. The band won eight GMA Dove Awards and three BMI Awards of Excellence. They were inducted into the Dollywood Gospel Hall of Fame and the Delta Music Museum Hall of Fame.

Hemphill authored four books, including a memoir about her husband in 2012.

Personal life and death
Hemphill married Joel Hemphill in 1957. Her father-in-law, W. T. Hemphill, was the founder of the Living Way Apostolic Church. They had two sons, Joey and Trent, and a daughter, Candy. They resided in Joelton, a neighborhood of Nashville, Tennessee.

Hemphill died on December 9, 2015 in Nashville, Tennessee, at 75. Her funeral was held in West Monroe, Louisiana.

Selected works

References

External links
LaBreeska Rogers Hemphill on Find a Grave

1940 births
2015 deaths
People from Bastrop, Louisiana
Singers from Louisiana
Singers from Nashville, Tennessee
20th-century American singers
Southern gospel performers
American non-fiction writers
20th-century American women singers
21st-century American women